is a Japanese weightlifter. She competed at the 2016 Summer Olympics, and 2020 Summer Olympics, in Women's 59 kg, winning a bronze medal.

Career
She has competed at six world championships

Most recently, she competed at the 2018 World Weightlifting Championships, winning a bronze medal in the Clean and Jerk portion of the competition.

She competed in the 58 kg category until 2018 and 59 kg starting in 2018 after the International Weightlifting Federation reorganized the categories.

She injured her knee three weeks before the 2020 Olympics, but rehabilitated to compete.

Major results

References

External links

1992 births
Living people
Japanese female weightlifters
Weightlifters at the 2014 Asian Games
Weightlifters at the 2016 Summer Olympics
Olympic weightlifters of Japan
Asian Games medalists in weightlifting
Weightlifters at the 2018 Asian Games
Medalists at the 2018 Asian Games
Asian Games bronze medalists for Japan
Weightlifters at the 2020 Summer Olympics
Olympic bronze medalists for Japan
Medalists at the 2020 Summer Olympics
Olympic medalists in weightlifting
21st-century Japanese women